The 2016–17 Philippine Basketball Association (PBA) Philippine Cup, also known as the 2016–17 Oppo-PBA Philippine Cup for sponsorship reasons, was the first conference of the 2016–17 PBA season. The tournament started on November 20, 2016, and ended on March 5, 2017. The tournament does not allow teams to hire foreign players or imports.

Format
The following format was observed for the duration of the conference: 
 Single-round robin eliminations; 11 games per team; Teams are then seeded by basis on win–loss records.
Top eight teams will advance to the quarterfinals. In case of tie, playoff games will be held only for the #8 seed.
Quarterfinals:
QF1: #1 vs #8 (#1 twice-to-beat)
QF2: #2 vs #7 (#2 twice-to-beat)
QF3: #3 vs #6 (best-of-3 series)
QF4: #4 vs #5 (best-of-3 series)
Semifinals (best-of-7 series):
SF1: QF1 Winner vs. QF4 Winner
SF2: QF2 Winner vs. QF3 Winner
Finals (best-of-7 series)
F1: SF1 Winner vs SF2 Winner

Elimination round

Team standings

Schedule

Results

Eighth seed playoff

Bracket

Quarterfinals

(1) San Miguel vs. (8) Rain or Shine

(2) Alaska vs. (7) Barangay Ginebra

(3) Star vs. (6) Phoenix

(4) TNT vs. (5) Globalport

Semifinals

(1) San Miguel vs. (4) TNT

(3) Star vs. (7) Barangay Ginebra

Finals

Awards

Conference
Best Player of the Conference: June Mar Fajardo 
Finals MVP: Chris Ross

Players of the Week

Statistics

Individual statistical leaders

Individual game highs

Team statistical leaders

References

External links
 PBA Official Website

Philippine Cup
PBA Philippine Cup